The First Presbyterian Church in Cartersville, Georgia, also known as Friendship Presbyterian Church, is a historic Presbyterian church at 183 W. Main Street.  It was started in 1853 and was added to the National Register in 1991.

The Friendship Presbyterian Church was organized in 1843, south of Cartersville.

References

Presbyterian churches in Georgia (U.S. state)
Churches on the National Register of Historic Places in Georgia (U.S. state)
Romanesque Revival church buildings in Georgia (U.S. state)
Churches completed in 1909
Buildings and structures in Bartow County, Georgia
National Register of Historic Places in Bartow County, Georgia